Katalin Szilágyi (born 16 November 1965 in Nyíregyháza) is a Hungarian former handball player who won the bronze medal with the Hungarian team at the 1996 Summer Olympics in Atlanta. She played all five matches and scored 13 goals.

Awards
 Hungarian Handballer of the Year: 1987

References

1965 births
Living people
Hungarian female handball players
People from Nyíregyháza
Olympic handball players of Hungary
Handball players at the 1996 Summer Olympics
Olympic bronze medalists for Hungary
Olympic medalists in handball
Medalists at the 1996 Summer Olympics
Sportspeople from Szabolcs-Szatmár-Bereg County